State Route 443 (SR 443) is a state highway in the Reno-Sparks metropolitan area of Washoe County, Nevada. It is the main connection between the city of Reno and the community of Sun Valley to the north. SR 443 is known as Clear Acre Lane in Reno and Sun Valley Drive within Sun Valley.

Route description

State Route 443 begins at its intersection with North McCarran Boulevard (SR 659). Just north of this junction, SR 443 interchanges with US 395. From here, the highway heads slightly northeast to the intersection of Dandini Blvd & El Rancho Drive, where the road changes names from Clear Acre Lane into Sun Valley Drive ("Sun Valley Boulevard" on some signs). SR 443 continues north from this intersection through Sun Valley, where it terminates at Seventh Avenue.

History
Originally, SR 443 extended further south to terminate at Wedekind Road (former SR 880). By 2006, the highway had been truncated to its current terminus at North McCarran Boulevard.

In 2004, the Washoe County Regional Transportation Commission began the US 395/Clear Acre reconstruction project.  The project created new US 395 freeway access at Clear Acre Lane and reconstructed the North McCarran Boulevard (SR 659) bridge and interchange ramps.  Previously, the only access between SR 443 and US 395 was a northbound US 395 off ramp; other movements were made via the nearby McCarran Boulevard interchange. As of June 2007, the construction project was substantially completed.

Major intersections

See also

References

443
Transportation in Washoe County, Nevada